Woptober (stylized in all caps) is a mixtape by American rapper Gucci Mane. It was released on October 14, 2016, by Atlantic Records and GUWOP Enterprises. The album features guest appearances from Rick Ross and Young Dolph, as well as the production that was provided by London on da Track, Honorable C.N.O.T.E., Zaytoven, Will-A-Fool, Southside, Metro Boomin and Drumma Boy, among others.

Singles
The album's lead single, "Bling Blaww Burr", was released on September 20, 2016. The song features a guest appearance from American rapper Young Dolph, while the production was provided by Metro Boomin.

Promotional singles
The album's first promotional single, "Icy Lil Bitch", was released on October 11, 2016. The song was produced by Zaytoven.

Track listing
Credits adapted from Tidal and ASCAP.

Personnel
Credits adapted from Tidal.

Technical
 Colin Leonard – mastering 
 Kori Anders – mixing 
 Sean Paine – recording

Charts

References

2016 albums
Gucci Mane albums
Albums produced by Cubeatz
Albums produced by Drumma Boy
Albums produced by Honorable C.N.O.T.E.
Albums produced by London on da Track
Albums produced by Metro Boomin
Albums produced by Southside (record producer)
Albums produced by TM88
Albums produced by Zaytoven